Sufi Saint Abdul-Karim Abd-ur-Razak; popularly known by the name of Sheikh Chilli, was a Qadiriyya Sufi, he was known for his wisdom and generosity. He was the master of Mughal Prince Dara Shikoh (A.D. 1650). Many people consider him a great darwesh. There is a Sheikh Chilli's Tomb located in Thanesar, Haryana, India, in Kurukshetra.

References

Qadiri order
People from Kurukshetra district
1600s births
17th-century Indian people